Planeta Rica is a town and municipality located in the Córdoba Department, northern Colombia.

References

 Gobernacion de Cordoba - Planeta Rica
 Planeta Rica official website

Municipalities of Córdoba Department